Bashkimi (Albanian for "unity") may refer to:

Name
Bashkim, male personal name

Newspapers
Bashkimi (Democratic Front newspaper), founded 1943
Bashkimi (PPSHR newspaper), organ of the Reorganised Party of Labour of Albania (PPSHR)

Politics
Unity for Human Rights Party (Partia Bashkimi për të Drejtat e Njeriut), a centrist political party in Albania
Liberal Democratic Union (Albania) (Bashkimi Liberal Demokrat)
Albanian Democratic Union Party (Partia Bashkimi Demokrat Shqiptar), a political party in Albania led by Ylber Valteri
Albanian Republican United Party (Partia Bashkimi Republikan Shqiptar, PBRSH), a political party in Albania
Union for Victory Coalition (Bashkimi për Fitoren), a coalition of political parties in Albania
Labour Youth Union of Albania (Bashkimi i Rinisë së Punës së Shqipërisë), a youth organization of the Party of Labour of Albania
Unification for Changes (Bashkimi për Ndryshim), a coalition in the Albanian parliamentary elections of 2009

Societies
Society for the Unity of the Albanian Language (Shoqnia e Bashkimit të Gjuhës Shqipe)

Sport
FK Bashkimi, a football club established in 1947, refounded in 2011
Bashkimi Prizren, or KB Bashkimi, a basketball club created in 1945
Bashkimi Shkodran, one of the six original members in the 1930 Albanian Superliga
Bashkimi Elbasan, a club in the 1933 Albanian First Division